The 2020 Minnesota United FC season was the eleventh season of Minnesota United FC's existence and their fourth season in Major League Soccer, the top-tier of American soccer. United plays at Allianz Field and is coached by Adrian Heath. Outside of MLS, Minnesota United were also scheduled to participate in the 2020 U.S. Open Cup and the 2020 Leagues Cup, before their cancelations due to the COVID-19 pandemic, as well as various preseason competitions.

Club

Transfers

Transfers in

MLS SuperDraft

Transfers out

Loans in

Loans out

Competitions

Overview

Disciplinary record

Clean sheets

Notes

References

Minnesota United FC seasons
Minnesota United
Minnesota
Minnesota